Petra Ruhrmann (born 2 August 1950) is a German former figure skater who represented West Germany. She became a two-time national silver medalist and competed at the 1968 Winter Olympics in Grenoble, placing 17th. She finished in the top ten at the 1967 European Championships in Ljubljana, Yugoslavia, and at the 1968 European Championships in Västerås, Sweden. Her coach was Hellmut Seibt.

Ruhrmann began coaching Angelo Dolfini, a four-time Italian national champion, when he was a child and guided him until the end of his career.

Competitive highlights

References 

1950 births
German female single skaters
German figure skating coaches
Figure skaters at the 1968 Winter Olympics
Living people
Olympic figure skaters of Germany
Sportspeople from Düsseldorf